Virginia Winslow Hopper Mathews (1925-2011) was a literacy advocate and author. Mathews, the daughter of American Indian author John Joseph Mathews, co-founded the American Indian Library Association (AILA). She also helped develop Sesame Street while serving as a consultant to Children's Television Workshop, and she promoted activities to support literacy through libraries.

Early life and education

Mathews graduated from the Beard School (now Morristown-Beard School) in Orange, NJ in 1942. After high school, she took college courses at Goucher College, the University of Geneva, and Columbia University. In 2004, Morristown-Beard School awarded Mathews their Distinguished Alumni Award.

Literacy advocacy

Mathews wrote reviews of children's books for The New York Herald Tribune and The New York Times. She also served as Deputy Director and then Director of the National Book Committee. The committee selected the National Book Awards and promoted public literacy during a 14-year period (1957 to 1974). Mathews's work with the National Book Committee to promote reading also helped created National Library Week. The Library of Congress now houses Mathews papers from her time working at the National Book Committee.

After leaving the National Book Committee, Mathews worked for the Center for the Book at the Library of Congress. Mathews organized the 1979 and 1991 White House Conferences on Library and Information Services. She also helped develop the American Library Association's collaborations with Head Start.

During the 1960s, Mathews created the children's TV series Reading Out Loud with Westinghouse Broadcasting executive Mike Santangelo. Produced by Westinghouse for syndication, the show featured notable figures reading aloud their favorite books to children. It debuted in February 1960 on the five TV stations owned by Westinghouse in Baltimore, Boston, Cleveland, Pittsburgh, and San Francisco. Reading Out Loud also opened on WNTA-TV (now WNET-TV) in New York City and 46 educational TV stations around the U.S. It ran as a half-hour show for 15 episodes. Reading Out Loud featured guest appearances by:

 First Lady Eleanor Roosevelt (reading Just So Stories by Rudyard Kipling)
 Actress Julie Harris (reading The Wind in The Willows)
 Actor José Ferrer (reading Huckleberry Finn)
 Baseball player Jackie Robinson (reading The Red Badge of Courage)
 Entertainer Gary Moore (reading The Legend of Sleepy Hollow)
Novelist Pearl S. Buck (reading Chinese fables)
 Actor Cyril Ritchard (reading Alice in Wonderland)
 Singer Harry Belafonte (reading a folk tale about the spider Anansi)
 Senator John F. Kennedy (reading The Emergence of Lincoln)

Honors and legacy

In 1965, the Women's National Book Association awarded Mathews their WNBA Book Award. The American Indian Library Association awarded Mathews their Distinguished Service to Indian Libraries Award in 1993. Two years later, The Association for Library Service to Children also awarded Mathews a Distinguished Service Award. In 2012, the American Indian Library Association named its library school scholarship after her.

Works
 Social Change and the Library, 1945-1980 (1969)
 Response to change: American libraries in the seventies, Issues 1-7 (1970)
 Continuing Adult Education and Indian Libraries (1975)
 Libraries for Today and Tomorrow: How Do We Pay for Them? Who Uses Them? Who Staffs Them? What are Their Services? (1978)
 Libraries, Aids to Life Satisfaction for Older Women: A 1981 White House Conference on the Aging Background Paper (1981)
 The Parent and Child Services Program: a 1995 sourcebook on parent and child projects (1995)
 Kids Can't Wait -- Library Advocacy Now!: A President's Paper (1996)
 Libraries, Citizens & Advocacy: The Lasting Effects of Two White House Conferences on Library and Information Services (2004)

References

1925 births
2011 deaths
Literacy advocates
Reading skill advocates
American women writers
Morristown-Beard School alumni
Goucher College alumni
Columbia University alumni
University of Geneva alumni
21st-century American women